Straška Gorca is a small settlement in the Municipality of Šentjur in eastern Slovenia. It lies in the Sava Hills, just off the road leading southeast from the town of Šentjur towards Kozje. The settlement, and the entire municipality, are included in the Savinja Statistical Region, which is in the Slovenian portion of the historical Duchy of Styria.

References

External links
Straška Gorca at Geopedia

Populated places in the Municipality of Šentjur